Snip is a Canadian animated short film, directed by Terril Calder and released in 2016. Released as a tie-in to Joseph Boyden's novella Wenjack, the film centres on two contemporary indigenous children, Annie and Gordon, who travel back in time in an effort to save two other children, Charlie and Niska, from the Indian residential school system.

The film premiered at the 2016 Toronto International Film Festival, and was named to TIFF's annual year-end Canada's Top Ten list for 2016. It was subsequently screened at the 67th Berlin International Film Festival in 2017, where it received an honorable mention from the short film jury in the Generation 14Plus program of youth films.

References

External links

2016 films
2016 animated films
2016 short films
Canadian animated short films
First Nations films
Works about residential schools in Canada
2010s English-language films
2010s Canadian films
Animated films about time travel